"Cowboy Beat" is a song recorded by American country music duo The Bellamy Brothers.  It was released in June 1992 as the first single from their compilation album The Latest and the Greatest.  The song reached #23 on the Billboard Hot Country Singles & Tracks chart.  It is their last Top 40 hit to date. The song was written by David Bellamy and John Beland.

Chart performance

References

Songs about cowboys and cowgirls
1992 singles
1992 songs
Songs written by David Bellamy (singer)
The Bellamy Brothers songs